Mary Jones Meyer was a World Series of Poker champion in the 2006 $1,000 Ladies - No-Limit Hold'em poker event.

As of 2014, her total WSOP tournament winnings exceed $350,000.

World Series of Poker bracelets

References

American poker players
Female poker players
World Series of Poker bracelet winners
Living people
Year of birth missing (living people)